WMGH, known as Magic 105.5, is an FM radio station in Tamaqua, Pennsylvania, sharing studios with co-owned WLSH in Lansford, Pennsylvania.  WMGH broadcasts an adult contemporary format.

External links
Official website
On The Radio information on WMGH

MGH-FM
Radio stations established in 1960